A tsunami is an unusually powerful series of water waves, a prominent recent example being:

 2011 Tohoku earthquake and tsunami

Tsunami may also refer to:

People
 Satoshi Tsunami (born 1961), Japanese football (soccer) coach and former international player
 Tsunami, a nickname of Takeru Kobayashi, a Japanese competitive eater

Comics and animation
 Tsunami, a minor character in Naruto
 Tsunami (DC Comics), a DC Comics character
 Tsunami (Marvel Comics), an imprint of Marvel Comics
 Tsunami (Tenchi Muyo!), a character in the Japanese franchise Tenchi Muyo!
 Mako Tsunami, a Yu-Gi-Oh! character

Music
 Tsunami (band), a 1990s indie-rock band from Virginia
 Tsunami (California band), a heavy metal band formed in 1983
 Sŵnami, a Welsh pop group

Songs
 "Tsunami" (Annalisa song)
 "Tsunami" (DVBBS and Borgeous song)
 "Tsunami" (Manic Street Preachers song)
 "Tsunami" (Southern All Stars song)
 "Tsunami", a song by Eugenio in Via Di Gioia
 "Tsunami", a song by Jimi Tenor
 "Tsunami", a song by Katy Perry from Witness
 "Tsunami", a song by Prozzäk
 "Tsunami", a song by Steriogram

Theme parks
 Tsunami Soaker, a "Twist 'N Splash" water ride at Six Flags St. Louis.
 The Penguin Ride, formerly Tsunami Soaker, a "Twist 'N Splash" water ride at Six Flags Discovery Kingdom.

Tradenames and similar
 Tsunami, a fragrance of the Axe brand.
 Tsunami 100, a trademarked brand name for a chemical made by Ecolab
 Tsunami (MPEG encoder), an MPEG-1 and MPEG-2 software encoder
 Tsunami Games, an American software house

Organisations
 NOAA National Tsunami Warning Center
 NOAA Pacific Tsunami Warning Center
 NOAA Center for Tsunami Research

Other uses
 Tsunami (2020 film), a Sri Lankan Sinhala disaster drama film
 Tsunami (2021 film), an Indian Malayalam-language sex comedy film
 Democratic Tsunami, catalan protest group advocating for self-determination.
 Tsunami puzzle, also called a Nonogram, or "Paint by numbers" puzzle
 Tsunami (roller coaster), a roller coaster at the San Marcos National Fair in Mexico
 Tsunami UDP Protocol, a computer networking protocol
 Wings of Change Tsunami, an Austrian paraglider design

See also
 Tsunami (comics), a set index article